Product code is a unique identifier, assigned to each finished/manufactured product which is ready, to be marketed or for sale.  

Product code may also refer to:
 Universal Product Code, common barcode used to identify packaged products
 Electronic Product Code, an RFID code mainly applied as a packaging code for packaged products
 Motion Picture Production Code (production code for short)
 Product key, a number used to verify the authenticity of a software as a license code
 Serial number, a number identifying an item per instance

See also 
 Barcode
 Code (disambiguation)
 Marketing part number
 Part number